The 1996–97 Connecticut Huskies men's basketball team represented the University of Connecticut in the 1996–97 collegiate men's basketball season. The Huskies completed the season with an 18–15 overall record. The Huskies were members of the Big East Conference where they finished with a 7–11 record. They came in Third Place in the 1997 National Invitation Tournament. The Huskies played their home games at Harry A. Gampel Pavilion in Storrs, Connecticut and the Hartford Civic Center in Hartford, Connecticut, and they were led by eleventh-year head coach Jim Calhoun.

Roster
Listed are the student athletes who were members of the 1996–1997 team.

Schedule 

|-
!colspan=12 style=""| Regular Season

|-
!colspan=12 style=""| Big East tournament

|-
!colspan=12 style=""| NIT

Schedule Source:

References 

UConn Huskies men's basketball seasons
Connecticut Huskies
Connecticut Huskies
1996 in sports in Connecticut
1997 in sports in Connecticut